Motor-Cycle  is the debut album by singer-songwriter Lotti Golden released on Atlantic Records in 1969. The album is a semiautobiographical account of Golden's immersion in the life of New York's LES and East Village, written in music & lyrics because, according to Golden, "a book is too flat.” "  Motor-Cycle describes the underground world of the late Sixties counterculture, “down to the last seconal capsule.”

Music and lyrics 
Musically, Motor-Cycle is a synthesis of stream of consciousness confessional poetry, R&B infused vocals and a "sometimes satiric mélange of rock, jazz, blues and soul". The album was composed by Golden as memoir recounting the time she spent in New York's East Village. describing the underground world of the late ‘60s with lyrics that evoke "a Kerouac novel." Golden's coming of age saga is likely the first rock concept album by a female recording artist. On an album of "restlessly epic roadhouse suites" Golden uses the story-based format, featuring a cast of archetypal characters while playing the part of "emcee" of her own "aberrant cabaret."

Critical reception 
Newsweek hailed Golden as a new breed of female troubadour—an artist who not only sings, but writes her own songs: "What is common to them -- to Joni Mitchell and Lotti Golden, to Laura Nyro, [and] Melanie... are the personalized songs they write, like voyages of self discovery...startling in the impact of their poetry." Motor-Cycle was listed among the most influential albums of the era by The New York Times music critic Nat Hentoff, who said in 1970, "It's an extraordinary evocation of a life-style... and one girl's plunge into and out of it." Village Voice critic Robert Christgau was less impressed, giving it a "D+" in his consumer guide Motor-Cycle [Atlantic, 1969] “I don't like this myself, but I also don't like Laura Nyro. If you do, you might glance at the lyrics on the back of the jacket.”

‘‘Motor-Cycle’’ continues to be referenced as a groundbreaking album as in a 2017 piece in The Guardian referencing the seminal female singer songwriters of the Sixties. Golden's song, from the LP, “Get Together (With Yourself)” appeared on the 2022  Hulu TV miniseries and soundtrack, Pam & Tommy.

In a retrospective review, music critic Path, of Tiny Mix Tapes, said how Motor-Cycle plays like a musical, transporting the listener to the late 60's underground: "Golden gets help on Motor-Cycle from an impeccably arranged Atlantic Records session band... with a flawless, swinging rhythm team. Then, at key moments, the curtain goes up and they've got rows of saxes, trumpets, vibes...and you begin to realize that this is not the same song and dance... it's as if The Velvet Underground recorded for Motown."

Track listing
All songs written by Lotti Golden, except track 5 (Golden/Bob Crewe).  Copyright Saturday Music.
"Motor-cycle Michael" 8:14
"Gonna Fay's" 8:31
"A Lot Like Lucifer (Celia Said Long Time Loser)" 6:32
"The Space Queens (Silky is Sad)" 7:21
"Who Are Your Friends" 5:52
"Get Together (With Yourself)" 5:36
"You Can Find Him" 5:13

References

External links 
 

1969 debut albums
Atlantic Records albums
Albums produced by Bob Crewe
Lotti Golden albums
Concept albums